Iryna Lis (born 26 December 1972) is a Belarusian dressage rider. She competed at the 2004 Summer Olympics where she finished 24th in the individual dressage competition. She also competed at the 2008 Summer Olympics.

References

Living people
1972 births
Belarusian female equestrians
Belarusian dressage riders
Olympic equestrians of Belarus
Equestrians at the 2004 Summer Olympics
Equestrians at the 2008 Summer Olympics